William Bowie Campbell (26 July 1920 – 1994) was a Scottish footballer who played as a wing half.

At senior club level he played solely for Morton, his hometown team, but was forced to retire due to ill health in January 1949, only eight months after he took part in the 1948 Scottish Cup Final, lost to Rangers after a replay.

Campbell represented Scotland five times (missing out on a sixth cap when his only pair of boots broke just prior to a match against France in Paris); he also featured in five unofficial wartime internationals.

References

1920 births
1994 deaths
Scottish footballers
Association football wing halves
Footballers from Greenock
Greenock Morton F.C. players
Scottish Football League players
Scottish Junior Football Association players
Scotland international footballers
Scotland wartime international footballers
Scottish Football League representative players